Hasan Kandi Kuh (also Romanized as Ḩasan Kandī Kūh; also known as Ḩasan Kandī) is a village in Almalu Rural District, Nazarkahrizi District, Hashtrud County, East Azerbaijan Province, Iran. At the 2006 census, its population was 51, in 7 families.

References 

Towns and villages in Hashtrud County